Elman Nasirov — Azerbaijani political scientist, political commentator, deputy of the National Assembly of Azerbaijan, Director of the Institute for Political Studies at the Academy of Public Administration of Azerbaijan.

Biography 
In 1989-1994 he received higher education at the History faculty of Baku State University (BSU) and graduated from the university with a diploma of distinction. In 1995-2000, the dissertation of the department of new and modern history of the countries of Europe and America, BSU. In parallel, 1995–2003, he worked at the Department of New and Contemporary History of the Countries of Europe and America at the Belarusian State University, where in 2001 he defended his dissertation on the topic “Azerbaijan-American Relations: 1991-1997” and received a doctorate in history.

In 2011, he defended his doctoral dissertation on the theme "The United States and the problems of international terrorism" and received a doctorate in political sciences. In 2012, he received the academic title of professor at the Department of International Relations and Foreign Policy of the Academy of Public Administration under the President of the Republic of Azerbaijan.

In 2004, he joined the editorial board of the scientific and practical journal "Public Administration: Fundamentals and Practice" and in 2012 became the executive secretary of this journal. In 2012, he joined the editorial board of the scientific and analytical journal "Geopolitics" of the Republic of Romania.

Since 2007, an expert of the Expert Council of Political and Historical Sciences of the Higher Attestation Commission under the President of the Republic of Azerbaijan.

In the period 2008-2013, he held the position of Deputy Director of the Geostrategic Research Center of the Academy of Public Administration under the President of the Republic of Azerbaijan. Since September 18, 2013 Director of the Institute for Political Studies of the Academy of Public Administration under the President of the Republic of Azerbaijan.

Books 
Azərbaycan-ABŞ münasibətləri. 1991-1997-ci illər”. Bakı, Qanun nəşriyyatı, 1998, 136 s.;
“Azərbaycan nefti və beynəlxalq müqavilələr. 1991-1999-cu illər”. Bakı, Qanun nəşriyyatı, 1999, 104 s.,
“ABŞ və dünya 11 sentyabrdan sonra”. Bakı, Adiloğlu, 2003, 262 s.,
Amerika Birləşmiş Ştatlarının antiterror doktrinası və onun tətbiqi mexanizmləri. Bakı, Elm və Təhsil, 2010, s.392
“Dövlət İdarəçiliyində varislik, novatorluq və dinamizm. İlham Əliyevin prezidentlik fəaliyyətinin xronikası: rəsmi qəbul və səfərlərinin icmalı (2003-2006)”.(həmmüəllif) Bakı, Azərbaycan nəşriyyarı, 2007, 944 s.
Dövlət İdarəçiliyində varislik, novatorluq və dinamizm. İlham Əliyevin prezidentlik fəaliyyətinin xronikası: rəsmi qəbul və səfərlərinin icmalı (2007–2008) II kitab (həmmüəllif)-Bakı, Azərbaycan nəşriyyarı, 2007, 754 s.

References

External links 
 http://www.aznews.az/site/?c=news&id=51104 

1968 births
Living people
 
Baku State University alumni
Deniers of the Armenian genocide